Katarina Srebotnik was the defending champion but did not complete in the Juniors this year.

Iroda Tulyaganova defeated Lina Krasnoroutskaya in the final, 7–6(7–3), 6–3 to win the girls' singles tennis title at the 1999 Wimbledon Championships. As such, Tulyaganova became the first girl from Asia to win a singles Grand Slam.

Seeds

 n/a
 n/a
  Anikó Kapros (quarterfinals)
  Iroda Tulyaganova (champion)
  Eleni Daniilidou (quarterfinals)
  María Emilia Salerni (second round)
  Lina Krasnoroutskaya (final)
  Dája Bedáňová (semifinals)
  Leanne Baker (second round)
  Elena Bovina (third round)
  Laura Bao (second round)
  Scarlett Werner (third round)
  Ivana Abramović (third round)
  Tatiana Perebiynis (semifinals)
  Laura Granville (second round)
  Ansley Cargill (third round)

Draw

Finals

Top half

Section 1

Section 2

Bottom half

Section 3

Section 4

References

External links

Girls' Singles
Wimbledon Championship by year – Girls' singles